Synpalamides rubrophalaris is a moth of the Castniidae family. It is known from Brazil.

References

Castniidae
Moths described in 1917